Juan Francisco Fresno Larraín (26 July 1914 – 14 October 2004) was a Chilean cardinal of the Roman Catholic Church. He served as Archbishop of Santiago de Chile from 1983 to 1990, and was elevated to the Cardinalate in 1985.

Early life and ordination
He was born in Santiago de Chile as the son of Luis Alfredo Fresno Ingunza y Elena Larraín Hurtado. He was educated at the seminary of Santiago de Chile and later at the Pontifical Gregorian University, Rome where he earned a licentiate in theology. He was ordained to the priesthood on 18 December 1937 at the cathedral of Santiago, by Horacio Campillo, archbishop of Santiago.

Priest and bishop
Between 1937 and 1958 he worked as a pastor, in spiritual director and was vice-director of the Minor Seminary. S.S. Pope Pius XII appointed him bishop of Copiapó on 15 June 1958. He attended the Second Vatican Council. He was promoted to the metropolitan see of La Serena on 28 July 1971. by pope Paul VI.

President of the Episcopal Conference of Chile
He was elected President of the Episcopal Conference of Chile in 1975. He played a key role in the efforts to restore democracy in Chile during the military dictatorship of Augusto Pinochet by making contact with opposition leaders and persuaded them to unite in a pro-democracy effort that included Marxists and the democratic right. After the fall of Pinochet he promoted their first tense contacts with the government and was one of the supporters of Acuerdo Nacional para la Transición a la Democracia Plena (National Agreement for the Transition to Full Democracy). This in turn led to the 1988 Chilean national plebiscite that marked the beginning of the end of the military regime.

Cardinal
Pope John Paul II named him Archbishop of Santiago de Chile on 3 May 1983. He was created Cardinal-Priest of S. Maria Immacolata di Lourdes a Boccea in the consistory of 25 May 1985. He resigned the pastoral government of the archdiocese on 30 March 1990. He lost the right to participate a conclave when turned 80 years of age, in 1994.

Death
He died 14 October 2004 at 8:50 p.m in his private residence in Santiago.

References

1914 births
2004 deaths
People from Santiago
Chilean cardinals
20th-century Roman Catholic archbishops in Chile
Roman Catholic archbishops of Santiago de Chile
Participants in the Second Vatican Council
Cardinals created by Pope John Paul II
Fresno
Roman Catholic archbishops of La Serena
Roman Catholic bishops of Copiapó